Central Middlesex Hospital is in the centre of the Park Royal business estate, on the border of two London boroughs, Brent and Ealing. It is managed by the London North West University Healthcare NHS Trust.

History

The hospital was established as an infirmary for sick paupers at the Willesden Workhouse in 1903. Extensions were built in 1908, 1911 and 1914. The facility became the Willesden Institution in 1914, the Park Royal Hospital in 1921 and the Central Middlesex County Hospital in 1931.

The hospital was badly damaged by enemy bombing during the Second World War. After the hospital joined the National Health Service in 1948, major additions included a maternity unit opened in 1966 and Ambulatory Care and Diagnostic Centre for out-patients opened in 1999.

Extensive new facilities were procured under a Private Finance Initiative contract in 2003. Under this scheme, while the Ambulatory Care and Diagnostic Centre built only a few years earlier was retained, most of the rest of the buildings on the site were demolished and a  new Brent Emergency Care and Diagnostic Centre was created. The works, which were designed by HLM Architects and Avanti Architects and carried out by Bouygues at a cost of £60 million, opened in 2006.

See also
List of hospitals in England
Patrick Mackay – serial killer who was born at the hospital in 1952

References

External links 

 
 Central Middlesex Hospital on the NHS website
 Inspection reports from the Care Quality Commission

NHS hospitals in London
Hospital buildings completed in 1999
1999 establishments in England
Teaching hospitals in London
Park Royal